Rinku Sharma (10 February 2021) was a hospital technician and a member of Bajrang Dal who was killed by stabbing in Mangolpuri, Delhi, on 10 February 2021.

Background 
Rinku Sharma, a resident of Delhi's Mangolpuri area, was allegedly stabbed and killed by four local residents in which three are Muslims as identified.

Investigation 
The Delhi Police arrested nine individuals associated with Sharma's death. Deen Mohd (40), Dilshan (22), Fayaiz (21) and Faizan (21), all residents of Mangolapuri, were arrested by a team of the Delhi Police’s Crime Branch. On 12 February, the Delhi Police presented a timeline of the events on 10 February that preceded the killing, alleging that Sharma was stabbed at a birthday party owing to a dispute over the closure of a friend's restaurant. Sharma's family responded by asserting that the alleged killers were involved with a previous dispute related Sharma's participation in the Bajrang Dal, the Vishva Hindu Parishad, and  a  fundraiser for the Ram Mandir template at Ayodhya. As of 22 February, a total of 9 people were arrested by the Delhi Police after a review of closed-circuit television footage. The case was transferred to the police department's Crime Branch.

Responses 

After Sharma's death, the Hindu nationalist organisation Vishva Hindu Parishad claimed that Sharma was killed for his participation in a fundraiser for the Ram Mandir temple. Sharma's family, on 12 February, also alleged that the killing was motivated by the fundraiser and claimed that Sharma was linked to both the Bharatiya Janata Party (BJP) and the Rashtriya Swayamsevak Sangh; Sharma's brother stated that Sharma was a member of the Bajrang Dal. The Delhi Police responded to the allegations via Twitter on 12 February, reasserting that the killing was motivated by the birthday party dispute and stating that "Any other motive alluded to this incident is factually wrong."

The North Delhi Municipal Corporation has declared to rename Mangolpuri Chowk in the name of Rinku Sharma.

See also 
 Murder of Nikita Tomar
 Murder of Kishan Bharvad
 Murder of Kanhaiya Lal
 Murder of Umesh Kolhe

References

External links 

 

People murdered in India
Violence against Hindus in India
Deaths by person in India
Deaths by stabbing in India
Year of birth missing
Year of death missing
Place of birth missing
Lynching deaths in India
Male murder victims
Riots and civil disorder in India
February 2021 crimes in Asia
Persecution by Muslims
Filmed killings in Asia
2021 murders in India
Religiously motivated violence in India
Bajrang Dal members
Islamic terrorism in India
People murdered in Delhi
Deaths by beating
Knife attacks